Vakadu mandal is one of the 34 mandals in Tirupati district in the Indian state of Andhra Pradesh. It is a part of Gudur revenue division.

History 
Vakadu mandal used to be a part of Nellore district and was made part of the newly formed Tirupati district on 4 April 2022.

Demographics 

Scheduled Castes and Scheduled Tribes made up 14,760 and 5,414 of the population respectively. It had a literacy rate of 60.54% with 66.42% among males and 54.48% among females.

Biodiversity 
Vakadu mandal has brackish water ecosystem. Every year, terrestrial and aquatic birds migrate to Pulicat Lake area for a temporary stay. The ecosystem covers an area of  including parts of the mandal along with Chittamur, Doravarisatram, Sullurpeta and Tada mandals. The terrestrial birds include painted storks, large egrets, little egrets, grey pelicans, grey herons; water birds include northern pintails, black-winged stilts, northern shovelers, common teal, seagulls, terns, sandpipers, and common coots.

Administration 
Vakadu mandal is a part of Gudur revenue division. As of 2011 census, the mandal comprises the following 41 villages:

 Note: Chennappagarimitta, Cherukumulam, Kapparampadu, Nagulamarri, Namkadu Bit - I, Namkadu Bit - II, Pedda Cheruvu, Pollakhandrika and Uttara Polam were uninhabited

Politics 
Vakadu mandal is a part of Gudur Assembly constituency and Tirupati Lok Sabha constituency. , the mandal had 24,483 eligible voters with 11,979 male voters and 12,504 female voters.

References 

Mandals in Tirupati district